Spanish Lake is a lake located in St. Ferdinand Township in the U.S. state of Missouri.

Spanish Lake was named because the Spanish Governor Zénon Trudeau used it as a place of rest and retirement.

References

Lakes of Missouri
Bodies of water of St. Louis County, Missouri